The 2020 Paris Eternal season was the second season of Paris Eternal's existence in the Overwatch League and their first under head coach Yun "Rush" Hee-won. The Eternal planned to host three homestand weekends in the 2020 season at Zénith Paris in Paris, France, but all homestand matches were canceled due to the COVID-19 pandemic.

On 24 October, the Eternal signed former Element Mystic head coach Yun "Rush" Hee-won as their new head coach. The Eternal won their first ever tournament championship on 6 July after taking down the San Francisco Shock in the Summer Showdown finals. Paris finished the regular season with 15 wins, 4 bonus wins from midseason tournaments, and 6 losses to claim the third seed in the North America season playoffs; however, a 0–3 loss to the Washington Justice on 6 September in the North America playoffs ended their season.

Preceding offseason

Organizational changes 
In October 2019, Paris Eternal parted ways with Felix "Féfé" Munch, who joined the team as their head coach midway through their inaugural season, assistant coach Kyle "KyKy" Souder, and manager Alban "Albless" de la Grange. The team signed Kim "NineK" Beom-hoon, former assistant coach of the San Francisco Shock, as a coach two days later, although the team did not specify whether he would serve as the team's head coach or assistant coach. On 24 October, the Eternal announced the acquisition of the former Element Mystic head coach Yun "Rush" Hee-won as their new head coach. In addition, the team also picked up former Shanghai Dragons and Element Mystic assistant coach Jeong "Levi" Chung-Hyeok and former Toronto Defiant support player Go "Aid" Jae-yoon as assistant coaches. On 10 December, Eternal signed former Washington Justice coach Kyoung-Ey "AVALLA" Kim as their assistant general manager.

Roster changes 
The Eternal enter the new season with no free agents, six players which they have the option to retain for another year, and four players under contract. The OWL's deadline to exercise a team option is 11 November, after which any players not retained will become a free agent. Free agency officially began on 7 October.

Acquisitions 
The Eternal's first offseason acquisition was on 24 October, when they signed former Element DPS player Mystic Kim "SP9RK1E" Young-han, one of the most sought after free agents of the offseason. SP9RK1E will not be eligible to play until 31 May 2020, when he turns 18. The following day, the team picked up two more former Element Mystic players in DPS Jung "Xzi" Kihyo and tank Choi "Hanbin" Han-bin. On 23 November, Paris signed former Hangzhou Spark tank player Jeong "NoSmite" Da-Un. The team signed tank player Eoghan "Smex" O'Neill from Montreal Rebellion on 3 December. Paris rounded out their roster on 7 January with the signing of support player Brice "FDGod" Monsçavoir.

Departures 
On 23 October, the Eternal announced that they would not exercise their option to retain DPS George "ShaDowBurn" Gushcha, DPS Karol "Danye" Szcześniak, main tank Roni "lhcloudy" Tiihonen, and off-tank Finnbjörn "Finnsi" Jónasson for the upcoming season.

Roster

Transactions 
Transactions of/for players on the roster during the 2020 regular season:
On 2 April, support Damien "HyP" Souville retired.
On 2 May, the Eternal transferred support Harrison "Kruise" Pond to the Toronto Defiant.
On 2 May, the Eternal signed support Joon "Fielder" Kwon.
On 7 May, support Luís "Greyy" Perestrelo retired.

Standings

Game log

Regular season

Midseason tournaments 

| style="text-align:center;" | Bonus wins awarded: 4

Postseason

References 

Paris Eternal
Paris Eternal season
Paris Eternal
Paris Eternal seasons